Benjamin Zachary Bronfman (born August 6, 1982) is an American entrepreneur and musician. Bronfman is a strategic advisor and principal investor with Algae Systems, a carbon capture project and an associate managing director at Global Thermostat, a bio-fuel company. He was a member of rock band The Exit (going by the name Ben Brewer) and he is a member of the music collective Teachers and co-founder of the Green Owl record label.

He is the second-eldest child of actress Sherry Brewer and Edgar Bronfman Jr. the former CEO of Warner Music Group. He and musician and activist Mathangi "M.I.A." Arulpragasam, better known under the stage name M.I.A., were engaged from 2009–2012 and have a son together.

Early life and education

Bronfman was born in New York City, and then lived in London briefly, during his father's tenure as managing director of Seagram Distilleries Europe.  The family returned in 1984, once his father became President of Seagram's U.S. marketing division. His mother is African-American and his father, Edgar Bronfman Jr., is Jewish American.

He is a member of the Lehman family via his paternal grandmother, Ann Loeb Bronfman.

Bronfman attended The Collegiate School in New York City, graduating in 2000.  He enrolled in Emerson College in Boston, Massachusetts, where he studied Politics and Law before dropping out.

Environment and technology

Bronfman became interested in progressive environmental technologies & geo-engineering in 2007. Teaming with Columbia University economist Graciela Chichilinsky he embarked on a project to reduce the atmospheric concentration of carbon dioxide.

In 2007, he became associate managing director of Global Thermostat, Chichilinsky and fellow Columbia Professor, Peter Eisenberger's technology firm focused on developing a technology for direct air capture of carbon dioxide.

The firm recently completed construction of its first pilot plant at The Stanford Research Institute. He was integral in convincing his father to invest in the firm, and thus the subsequent appointment of Edgar Bronfman Jr. as chairman. In 2010, Benjamin Bronfman was named Strategic Advisor of Global Thermostat.

On November 13, 2010, Bronfman presented Global Thermostat's vision and process as a speaker at the TED Brooklyn Conference at Pratt Institute in Brooklyn, NY.

In 2010, Bronfman also became a principal investor and advisor at Algae Systems, LLC, a third-generation bio-fuel company founded by Matthew Atwood that takes waste water from cities (using CO2 captured by GT) and generates jet fuel and diesel.

Music

Bronfman was guitarist for The Exit, an indie/punk/reggae rock band he started with Gunnar Olsen and Jeff DaRosa in 2000, while he attended Emerson College.

During this time period, he went by Ben Brewer, using his mother's maiden name to avoid unnecessary associations between the band and his father. In 2007, shortly after the official announcement of The Exit's breakup, Bronfman founded Green Owl, an independent record label distributed by Warner Music Group, created to be the first environmentally conscious sustainable record label and apparel line.

In 2010, he started a music collective known as Teachers (sometimes stylized TΣ∆CHΣRS) with Grey McMurray, Steve Borth, Matt Kranz, and Scottie Redix.  The first single, "Gold", debuted on the website of the music editorial, The Fader, on July 12, 2010. Bronfman and Teachers worked with Kanye West and contributed to his single "Monster" featuring Jay-Z, Nicki Minaj, Rick Ross and Bon Iver.

In 2013, Teachers co-produced New Slaves, the first single out of Kanye's Yeezus album, earning Bronfman his first Grammy nomination.

Personal life
Bronfman met British rapper M.I.A. in the Bedford-Stuyvesant neighborhood of Brooklyn, New York in 2008. They became engaged and M.I.A gave birth to their son, Ikhyd Edgar Arular Bronfman, on February 13, 2009. In February 2012, it was announced that the two had separated.

Bronfman has two sisters, Hannah and Vanessa.

References

External links
Algae Systems official website
Global Thermostat official website
Teachers official website

1982 births
African-American Jews
African-American musicians
American environmentalists
American people of Russian-Jewish descent
Benjamin
Collegiate School (New York) alumni
Emerson College alumni
Living people
Musicians from New York City
Canadian people of African-American descent
Lehman family
Carl M. Loeb family